Clann An Drumma (Scots Gaelic for "Children of the Drum") is a tribal band from Glasgow, Scotland.  Clann An Drumma was formed by Joe Kilna MacKenzie, Jacquie Holland, and Tu-Bardh Stormcrow Wilson, among others.  Their line-up has changed over the years.

Their music involves heavy use of percussion and Highland bagpipes.  The band's motto is "Keep it Tribal".  As of 2018, the band has released a total of six studio albums.

One of their better-known pieces is "Sgt. MacKenzie". It was composed by Joe MacKenzie in memory of his great grandfather, Charles Stuart MacKenzie, who died bravely in battle during World War I.  "Sgt. MacKenzie" is perhaps a departure from their normal style, as its drumming and piping are subdued, and it is primarily a vocal piece.  It was featured in the soundtrack to the film, We Were Soldiers (2002), and in the movie End of Watch (2012).

Joe Kilna MacKenzie died after a long illness, on 28 April 2009.

Current members
 Dougie Wilkinson – bagpipes, tin whistle, vocals
 Alan Lamb – lead drums, snare drum, percussion
 Grant MacLeod – bagpipes
 Scott Kemp – bass drum
 Jamie Wilson – MC, percussion

Timeline

Discography

Studio albums
 Tried & True (2001)
 Keep It Tribal (2002)
 Tribal Eyes (2004)
 Tribal Heart (2007) – Re-recorded as Tribal Heart (Rebirth Edition) (2018)
 Bloodline (2013)
 Order of the Stag (2017)

Live albums
 Tribal Waves (2004)
 Raw (2012)

Compilation albums
 Tribal Vortex (2004)
 The Gathering (2018)

See also
Albannach

References

External links

Scottish pipe bands
Musical groups from Glasgow